Brian Carpenter may refer to:

Brian Carpenter (engineer), British engineer
Brian Carpenter (musician), American musician/composer
Brian Carpenter (American football), American football player